Golcar is a village and an unparished area in the metropolitan borough of Kirklees, West Yorkshire, England.   Golcar ward contains 165 listed buildings that are recorded in the National Heritage List for England.  Of these, two are listed at Grade II*, the middle of the three grades, and the others are at Grade II, the lowest grade.  The ward is to the west of the town of Huddersfield and contains the village of Golcar and the surrounding area, including the districts of Cowlersley, Longwood, and Milnsbridge.  During the 19th century the area became involved in the woollen textile industry and the listed buildings surviving from this are mills and weavers' cottages, the latter forming a large part of this list.  The textile industry was supported by the Huddersfield Narrow Canal and the River Colne that run through the ward, and the listed buildings associated with these are bridges, an aqueduct, a canal basin, and a milestone.  The other listed buildings include houses, cottages and associated structures, farmhouses and farm buildings, church and chapels and associated structures, weavers' cottages converted into a museum, two railway viaducts, a drinking trough, a public house, schools, and a row of tenter posts.


Key

Buildings

References

Citations

Sources

Lists of listed buildings in West Yorkshire